Kostas Karamanlis served as a Prime Minister of Greece for two consecutive terms. During his incumbency, the period 2004-2009, he formed two cabinets. The second Kostas Karamanlis cabinet was formed after the 2007 elections and was succeeded by the George Papandreou Cabinet.

Second Karamanlis cabinet, 2007–2009
On September 18, 2007, after the re-election of his government, Prime Minister Kostas Karamanlis announced his second cabinet, the members of which assumed office on 19 September 2007.

As part of a reorganisation of the ministries, the incoming government announced:
 the merger of the Ministry of the Interior, Public Administration and Decentralisation and the Ministry of Public Order to form the Ministry of the Interior and Public Order;
 the merger of the Ministry of the Mercantile Marine and the Ministry of the Aegean and Island Policy to form the Ministry of Mercantile Marine and Island Policy.

On 7 January 2009, Karamanlis announced another major cabinet reshuffle.

Defunct cabinet positions
 Minister for Industry, Energy and Technology
 Minister for Trade
 Minister for the Press and the Media

Karamanlis, Kostas 2
2007 in Greek politics
2008 in Greek politics
2009 in Greek politics
2007 establishments in Greece
2009 disestablishments in Greece
Cabinets established in 2007
Cabinets disestablished in 2009
New Democracy (Greece)